Boizot is a French surname. Notable people with the surname include: 

 Louis-Simon Boizot (1743–1809), French sculptor
 Peter Boizot (1929–2018), English entrepreneur, restaurateur, politician, art collector and philanthropist

See also
 Boisot

French-language surnames